The Terrier vehicle is an air-transportable armoured combat engineer vehicle for the Royal Engineers. It is being developed as a replacement vehicle for the FV180 Combat Engineer Tractor used by the British Army.

Design
The vehicle will weigh about 30 tonnes, light enough to be air transportable by C-17 Globemaster III or Airbus A400M.

A clamshell front bucket and side-mounted excavator arm will allow the vehicle to perform earth-moving and obstacle-removing tasks. In normal operations it will have a crew of two. It will have enhanced modular armour and will be faster at up to 70 km per hour and more mobile than the FV180 Combat Engineer Tractor, and will have 360-degree day-and-night-vision systems.

The contract to design and build the vehicle was won by BAE Systems Land and Armaments in the UK in July 2002.

Other companies have been subcontracted to provide expertise in specific areas. These companies, together with an indication of their involvement, include:

 GKN Aerospace: innovative fuel system
 Caterpillar Inc.: powerpacks and C18 Caterpillar  engine
 Corus: fabricated hull

History
A prototype vehicle was officially unveiled on 28 May 2005.

BAE Systems has built four demonstrator vehicles currently undergoing trial. This will be followed by the commencement of full-scale production of 60 vehicles in their factory at Newcastle upon Tyne. A re-baselined Terrier programme is on track with reliability growth trials contracted for early 2010. Manufacture of the first TERRIER production hull began on 27 January 2010 at the company's Newcastle plant. The vehicle is in service as of 5 June 2013. A total of 60 vehicles were delivered to the British Army.

The French Military has shown an interest in purchasing Terriers from the UK.

Crew training
Training of the Terrier crews is carried out in the Terrier Mission Crew Trainer (MCT) developed by BAE Systems Integrated System Technologies (Insyte) at their plant in Fife, Scotland.  The trainer comprises a high fidelity simulated crew cab, with commander and driver positions, mounted on a motion platform, and surrounded by a 360 degree, rear projection, visual system.  The MCT allows crews simulate driving, digging and other vehicle functions.  Four MCTs are in development for the British Army.

References

External links
 Terrier Manoeuvre Support Vehicle at Jane's
 Terriers for the Royal Engineers Defense Industry Daily, 01-Apr-2009
 Alternative LDT lends itself to mobile equipment Hydraulics & Pneumatics (article on electronic controls of Terrier's hydraulic cylinders)

Military engineering vehicles of the United Kingdom
Military vehicles introduced in the 2010s